Aakola is a village in Pathardi taluka, Ahmadnagar district of Maharashtra state in Indian territory.

Geography
The village is located on intersection of Pathardi.

Education
Computers
Coaching Classes- Success 100% Since 2007
Coaching Classes

Schools & Colleges
 Jilha Parishad Primary School
 Highschool and Jr. college.

References

Villages in Pathardi taluka
Villages in Ahmednagar district